Delfino was one of four s built for the  (Royal Italian Navy) during the late 1920s. The boat served in World War II and was sunk in 1943 after a collision with another Italian ship.

Design and description
The Squalo-class submarines were essentially repeats of the preceding . They displaced  surfaced and  submerged. Their crew numbered 53 officers and enlisted men.

For surface running, the boats were powered by two  diesel engines, each driving one propeller shaft. When submerged each propeller was driven by a  electric motor. They could reach  on the surface and  underwater.

The boats were armed with eight internal  torpedo tubes, four each in the bow and stern. They carried a total of a dozen torpedoes. They were also armed with one  deck gun for combat on the surface. Their anti-aircraft armament consisted of two  machine guns.

Construction and career
Delfino, named for the dolphin, was laid down on 27 October 1928 at the Cantieri Riuniti dell'Adriatico (CRDA) shipyard at Monfalcone. She was launched on 27 April 1930 and completed on 19 June 1931. After entering service the boat made two long cruises; to the Black Sea in 1933, and to the eastern Mediterranean in 1934. In December 1936 she patrolled the eastern coast of Spain during Spanish Civil War, making one failed attack against a merchant ship. In 1937, following the Second Italo-Ethiopian War, Delfino was sent to operate in the Red Sea, returning to Messina the following year.

After the entry of Italy into the Second World War in June 1940, Delfino operated in the Aegean Sea. On 15 August 1940 Delfino it was involved in a disgraceful incident during which it torpedoed and sank the neutral, at the time, which was at anchor off Tinos, attending the Virgin Mary celebrations as honour guard. The Greeks had been concerned that the old modernized light cruiser/minelayer Elli would be vulnerable following a number of unprovoked bombing attacks by Italian aircraft on Greek naval vessels, during that summer. However, the prevailing view was that this Holy day, being also a Holy day for Catholic Italians, as it was for Orthodox Greeks, would weigh against any attack. According to Italy's Foreign Minister, Count Ciano, the attack, ordered by Mussolini, was intended to intimidate the Greeks, who were neutral, but had, in view of earlier attacks, recently (April 1940) accepted British guarantees against the Axis. The Italian government denied Greek accusations of mounting the attack, but the Greeks recovered fragments of the torpedoes, and proved them to be of Italian origin. The Italians in turn accused the British of making the attack using torpedoes bought before the war. The operation succeeded only in uniting Greeks, solidifying their response to Italy's ultimatum two months later (October 28).

On 29 November 1940, in the northern Aegean, Delfino fired two torpedoes at a convoy, and reported that the  had been hit, but this was never confirmed. On 1 August 1941, on patrol off Tobruk, Delfino was attacked by a British Short Sunderland aircraft of 230 Squadron, and succeeded in shooting it down, and rescuing four men from the crew of twelve. Following further patrols around Sicily and Malta, in February 1942, Delfino was assigned to the Submarine School at Pula for training missions. She returned to active duty in November 1942, based at Taranto, carrying out three transport missions to North Africa, taking over 200 tons of ammunition and fuel. She was then refitted between January to March 1943. On 23 March 1943 Delfino sank an hour after leaving Taranto, after colliding with her escort boat, with the loss of 28 crew.

See also
Italian submarines of World War II

References

Bibliography

External links
 Delfino (1930)  Marina Militare website

1930 ships
Squalo-class submarines
World War II submarines of Italy
Lost submarines of Italy
World War II shipwrecks in the Mediterranean Sea
Maritime incidents in March 1943
Ships built by Cantieri Riuniti dell'Adriatico
Submarines sunk in collisions